Rhaphiptera clarevestita is a species of beetle in the family Cerambycidae. It was described by Tippmann in 1952. It is known from Brazil.

References

clarevestita
Beetles described in 1953